Hans Arnold (8 October 1941 – 8 May 1991) was a German football player. He spent eight seasons in the Bundesliga with VfB Stuttgart. The best result he achieved was fifth place. He was involved in the Bundesliga scandal in 1971.

References

External links
 

1941 births
1991 deaths
German footballers
Germany under-21 international footballers
VfB Stuttgart players
Bundesliga players
SpVgg Ludwigsburg players
VfR Mannheim players
Association football midfielders
20th-century German people